One male athlete from Uruguay competed at the 1996 Summer Paralympics in Atlanta, United States. Jorge Llerena, who won the bronze medal in the Men's 200 m T10 competition.

Medallists

See also
Uruguay at the Paralympics
Uruguay at the 1996 Summer Olympics

References 

Nations at the 1996 Summer Paralympics
1996
Summer Paralympics